Events in chess during the year 2001:

Top players

FIDE top 10 players by Elo rating – October 2001;

Garry Kasparov  2838
Vladimir Kramnik  2809
Viswanathan Anand  2770
Alexander Morozevich  2742
Peter Leko  2739
Veselin Topalov  2733
Michael Adams  2731
Vassily Ivanchuk  2731
Evgeny Bareev  2719
Loek van Wely  2714

Tournaments

Deaths
Alexei Suetin, Russian chess grandmaster and chess author – September 10
Claude Bloodgood, controversial American chess player, died in prison – August 4
Tony Miles, English chess Grandmaster – 12 November

References

 
21st century in chess
Chess by year